Mackey may refer to:

Places
 Mackey, Indiana, United States, a town
 Mackey, Iowa, United States, an unincorporated community
 Mackey, a community in the municipality and incorporated township of Head, Clara and Maria, Ontario, Canada
 Mackey Rock, Marie Byrd Land, Antarctica

Other uses
 Mackey (name), including a list of people with the name
 Mackey Airlines, former U.S. regional airline
 Mackey Arena, an indoor sports venue at Purdue University

See also
 Mackay (disambiguation)
 Mackeys (disambiguation)
 McKay (disambiguation)
 McKay (given name)
 McKay
 McKey (disambiguation)